Trench shoring is the process of bracing the walls of a trench to prevent collapse and cave-ins.  The phrase can also be used as a noun to refer to the materials used in the process.

Several methods can be used to shore up a trench.  Hydraulic shoring is the use of hydraulic pistons that can be pumped outward until they press up against the trench walls.  This is typically combined with steel plate or a special heavy plywood called Finform.  Another method is called beam and plate, in which steel I-beams are driven into the ground and steel plates are slid in amongst them.  A similar method that uses wood planks is called soldier boarding.  Hydraulics tend to be faster and easier; the other methods tend to be used for longer term applications or larger excavations.

Shoring should not be confused with shielding by means of trench shields.  Shoring is designed to prevent collapse, whilst shielding is only designed to protect workers should collapse occur. Most professionals agree that shoring is the safer approach of the two.

See also
Retaining wall

References

Geotechnical shoring structures
Cuts (earthmoving)